John, David, and Jacob Rees House, also known as Lefevre Farm, is a historic home located at Bunker Hill, Berkeley County, West Virginia. It is an "L" shaped, log, stone and brick dwelling on a stone foundation.  It measures 45 feet wide by 70 feet deep, and was built in three sections, the oldest, three bay log section dating to about 1760.  The two story, three bay rubble stone section is in the Federal style and built in 1791.  The front section was built about 1855 and is a five bay wide, -story building in the Greek Revival style.  Also on the property is a small stone spring house and log barn.

It was listed on the National Register of Historic Places in 1984.

References

Houses on the National Register of Historic Places in West Virginia
Federal architecture in West Virginia
Greek Revival houses in West Virginia
Houses completed in 1761
Houses in Berkeley County, West Virginia
National Register of Historic Places in Berkeley County, West Virginia